In the comic-strip field, a zombie strip (also known as a "legacy strip") is one whose creator has died or retired, but which continues to exist with new editions in publication. The strips are taken over by others, often relatives of the originator. Zombie comic strips are often criticized as lacking the "spark" that originally made the strip successful.

Reasons and criticism 
The usual reason for continuing a strip as a zombie is to keep the profitable business or franchise going, preserving a number of jobs and allowing future generations to enjoy the work in a new form. Both the creator's relatives and the strip's syndicate stand to make significant money in royalties. In the early days of comic strips, it was commonplace for a strip to be taken over by successors once the original cartoonist died; one of the earliest high-profile cartoonists to reject "zombie stripping" was George Herriman, who decreed that his strip Krazy Kat not be continued after his death. (Herriman, along with his strip, died in 1944.)

The practice of continuing a zombie comic strip is commonly criticized by cartoonists, particularly younger ones in the new generation, including Bill Watterson and Stephan Pastis. Pastis addressed the issue in his strip, Pearls Before Swine, in 2005. Mark Tatulli also commented on zombie strips in his strip Liō in 2010 and in 2013. After an incident in which United Feature Syndicate secretly retained the services of superhero comic artist Al Plastino to continue the comic strip Peanuts in case of an interruption, the heirs of Charles Schulz, author and creator of Peanuts, requested that his strip not be continued by another cartoonist after his death. Since Schulz's death in 2000, Peanuts has continued in reruns under two lines: a Classic Peanuts from the 1960s and Peanuts Begins from the 1950s; a number of non-canon animated Peanuts productions were produced and released after Schulz's death.

The principal criticism directed toward continuing a zombie strip is that the replacement cartoonist is seen as generally less funny or less inspired than the creator ("still stumbling around decades after their original creators have retired or died"), or that the new cartoonist does not have the same style of writing or understand the characters as well. The death of the cartoonist and the strip's succession into zombie status thus is akin to the concept of "marrying Irving" or "jumping the shark", in that the strip never returns to the quality or popularity it had during the run by the original cartoonist. An additional criticism is that continuing such strips prevents newer cartoonists from entering the business by filling newspaper space that might be devoted to new strips. However, in numerous cases, the new head cartoonist has often been the assistant of the former, as Dennis the Menace, after Hank Ketcham's retirement, was developed by his former assistants who have taken over, similar to sporting coaches in a coaching tree, the new head cartoonist has been an understudy of the former. Often the new cartoonist has developed the strip over a few years. As another counterpoint, zombie strips can also provide proving grounds for unknown artists to prove their worth with an established brand; Jerry Scott began his national career as author of the zombie strip Nancy (and was given the artistic freedom to draw the strip in a style much different than his predecessor) before launching his own strips, Baby Blues and Zits.  In other cases, some strips have passed within generations of the original artist.  Such has taken place most notably with the Keane (The Family Circus), Hart (B.C. and The Wizard of Id), and Walker (Beetle Bailey and Hi and Lois) families, where the cartoons are currently written by Jeff Keane, Mason Mastroianni, and brothers Brian and Greg Walker (sons), respectively.

Examples 
Zombie strips include Adam@home, Andy Capp, Blondie, Dennis the Menace, B.C., The Wizard of Id, Frank and Ernest, Hi and Lois, Hägar the Horrible, Dick Tracy, Rex Morgan, M.D., Mary Worth, Prince Valiant, The Family Circus, The Born Loser, Shoe, Spy vs. Spy, Barney Google and Snuffy Smith, and Ginger Meggs. Now-defunct strips that were zombies for a time before being discontinued include Terry and the Pirates, Little Orphan Annie, and Brenda Starr.

Lying somewhere in a gray area are strips that still have an association with their original author but receive significant assistance from others. The most widely known example of this is the widely syndicated Garfield, which was created and is still managed by Jim Davis but is currently written and drawn by staff at Paws, Inc., which handles his brand licensing rights, and as of 2019, is a subsidiary of Paramount Global, which acquired the Garfield franchise in the same year. Another example are the multi-generational strips, such as B.C., The Wizard of Id, Hi and Lois, Beetle Bailey, and The Family Circus. In those cases, the strips in later years were drawn by the original author with other family members. Following the deaths of the original authors, the next generation in the family continued drawing (the Mastroianni brothers, the Walker brothers, and Jeff Keane).

One example of a zombie work outside of comic strips includes the animated television series SpongeBob SquarePants, a series which continues to produce new episodes despite the death of creator Stephen Hillenburg in 2018. Hillenburg had largely stepped away from the show after 2004, but continued to serve as executive producer before returning to more active involvement in 2015 until his death. In a similar situation, Nickelodeon continued to produce episodes of The Ren & Stimpy Show even after firing the show's creator, John Kricfalusi.

See also 
Jumping the Shark

References

Comic strips
Pejorative terms
Criticisms